Frederick Emerson Peters (September 28, 1885 – July 25, 1959) was an American impostor who wrote bad checks masquerading as scholars and famous people. In an age before mass communication, few store owners bothered to ID check writers. He was born in West Salem, Ohio.

Background
Peters began his career of passing phony checks around 1902 when he presented himself as Theodore Roosevelt II, the son of the US president. He used fraudulent checks for his purchases, writing them to round numbers just a couple of dollars above the price of the purchase. Many of the fooled businesses were still impressed and even framed the checks as mementos.

Peters was eventually arrested in 1915 and sentenced to ten years in prison. He took charge of the prison library and used it to study various subjects to further his plans.

When he was released he took a role of antique expert "R.A. Coleman" of the American Peace Society. He visited antique shops ostensibly to buy items for museum collections and again rounded off checks for his "commission". As "J.J. Morton", he bought books for universities.

Over the following years he impersonated real people like Franklin D. Roosevelt, Booth Tarkington and Gifford Pinchot II. He was also jailed many times, but always returned to his old activities later. Further research would be needed to clarify if he was the same Frederick Emerson Peters who on July 2, 1951 became the 22nd Ten Most Wanted Fugitive listed by the FBI, and who was then arrested by two FBI agents when they recognized him in a Washington, D.C. hotel lobby on January 15, 1952.

When asked why he kept returning to crime, Peters gave a classic response: "It would require the rock-like will of the Sphynx to resist such temptation." When he was found dead in 1959, he had five checks on his pockets - all of them written for different names. Peters died on July 25, 1959 at a hotel in New Haven, Connecticut of a cerebral hemorrhage.

References

External links
Peters in the Identity Theft and ID Fraud profile
Beverly Smith - Crook that Everyone Liked (Saturday Evening Post December 12, 1959)

1885 births
1959 deaths
American fraudsters
American people of Dutch descent
Fugitives
Impostors
People from West Salem, Ohio